Telan Island, also Ostrov Telan, is an island in the Sea of Okhotsk, roughly 1 mile south-southwest of Mys Vnutrenniy. It is described as "a very conspicuous island resembling a castle."

Geography
The island is located at the southern end of the Taygonos Peninsula, which separates the Gizhigin Bay from the Penzhina Bay. It is roughly triangular in shape and has a maximum length of 1.7 km; it is separated from the continental shore by a 0.5 km wide sound.

Administratively Telan Island is part of the Magadan Oblast.

References

Islands of the Sea of Okhotsk
Islands of the Russian Far East
Islands of Magadan Oblast
Uninhabited islands of Russia